Basketball TV or BTV was a Philippine pay television sports channel with offices on Shaw Boulevard, Mandaluyong. It was owned by the Solar Entertainment Corporation. It was launched on October 1, 2006, rebranding the Sports Plus channel. On September 25, 2019, it announced on its official Facebook page as well as on its Instagram and Twitter accounts that the channel and NBA Premium TV will cease their operations on October 1, 2019. The final program to air on this channel was a replay of NBA Playoff Playback on September 30, 2019, before signing off at 12:00 m.n. on October 1, 2019.

Upon the channel's termination, Sky Cable and Cignal in their joint statement said that they were jointly negotiating directly with the NBA to make games and programming available to millions of fans in the Philippines. “We have submitted an offer to the NBA and are awaiting a response.”

History
The channel focused on NBA TV-related programs and also regular NBA games. In its initial broadcasts, it was showing re-runs of the 2006 NCAA Division I men's basketball tournament and the 2006 FIBA World Championship.
It also covered the Philippine Collegiate Champions League (PCCL), National Capital Region Athletic Association (NCRAA), National Basketball League (NBL) and National Basketball Conference (NBC) games.

A supplementary channel, NBA Premium TV (now defunct), was launched in time for the 2010–11 NBA season, featuring over 400 games with no local commercials. 

On April 10, 2017, Sky Cable, Destiny Cable & Sky Direct dropped Basketball TV along with NBA Premium TV, Jack TV, Solar Sports & CT (now defunct) allegedly due to Sky Cable's unpaid carriage fees. However, on October 16, 2018, the channel was restored on Sky Cable & Sky Direct after 18 months of carriage disputes. On October 28, 2018, the channel was dropped again on Sky Cable & Sky Direct.

Final programming

NBA
 NBA Action*
 NBA.com Fantasy Insider*
 NBA Inside Stuff*
 NBA Gametime Live
 NBA Games
 Real NBA*
 The Beat*
 The Starters*
 Inside the NBA*
 The Jump on NBA.com*
 NBA D-League Central*
 NBA D-League Game of the Week*
 WNBA Games
 WNBA Action**
 NBA Playoffs Playback
 NBA Summer League
 NBA Draft
 One on One with Ahmad Rashad
 Open Court
 Hardwood Classics
 NBA Marquee Match-up
 NBA Playoff Playback
 Making the Call with Ronnie Nunn
 NBA Draft Playback
 Sounds of the Finals
 The Run
 Overtime
 NBA Stories
 Marv Albert Show
 NBA Greatest Games / Hardwood Classics
 NBA Home Video
 NBA Basketballography
 NBA Specials
 Vintage NBA
 NBA Vault
 NBA Wired
 Books and Basketball
 NBA Journeys
 NBA Presents
 NBA Fit
 NBA Slideshow
 NBA Jam (local or original version)
 NBA Access with Ahmad Rashad
 NBA 360
 NBA Hoop Party
 NBA TV Top 10 Games of the Week
 Real Training Camp

FIBA
 2008 Beijing Olympics
 2012 London Olympics
 Stankovic Cup
 FIBA Diamond Ball
 FIBA World Basketball*
 FIBA World Championship
 FIBA Asia Championship
 FIBA Americas Championship
 EuroBasket

[*] – Also currently airing on Solar Sports

College
 ACC men's basketball tournament
 NCAA Division I men's basketball tournament
 Philippine Collegiate Championship
 One U

[*] – Broadcast rights moved to ABS-CBN Sports through ABS-CBN Sports+Action.

Local leagues
 Philippine Basketball League
 Nike Elite Camp
 Fil-Oil / Flying V Invitational Cup
 Philippine Basketball Association
 Philippine Women Basketball League
 Liga Pilipinas
 ASEAN Basketball League

Other foreign leagues
 Euroleague (briefly moved to ESPN Star Sports in the 2009–10 season)
 National Basketball League
 Chinese Basketball Association
 Liga ACB

Other
 Home Shopping Network
 Shop TV

See also
 Solar Entertainment Corporation, official broadcasting
 Solar Sports, Basketball TV sister channel
 NBA Premium TV, Basketball TV sister channel
 PBA Rush
 NBA TV Philippines

References

External links
 

Television channels and stations established in 2006
Television channels and stations disestablished in 2019
Former Solar Entertainment Corporation channels
Defunct television networks in the Philippines
Basketball mass media
National Basketball Association on television
Sports television networks in the Philippines
Men's interest channels
Television networks in the Philippines
English-language television stations in the Philippines
2006 establishments in the Philippines
2019 disestablishments in the Philippines